Ali Moustafa (Arabic:علي مصطفى) (born 1 May 1995) is an Emirati footballer. He currently plays as a defender for Emirates Club .

Career

Al Ain
Ali Moustafa started his career at Al Ain and is a product of the Al Ain's youth system.

Emirates Club
On 9 June 2017 left Al Ain and signed with Emirates Club, On 14 October 2017, Ali Moustafa made his professional debut for Emirates Club against Shabab Al-Ahli in the Pro League, replacing Park Jong-woo.

External links

References

1995 births
Living people
Emirati footballers
Al Ain FC players
Emirates Club players
UAE Pro League players
UAE First Division League players
Association football defenders
Place of birth missing (living people)